Colégio Planalto is a Portuguese boys-only school, located in Lisbon, Portugal. It is a Catholic school and a member of the IB Diploma Programme. Opus Dei, an institution of the Catholic Church, is in charge of its religious teachings and services.

History
The school was created in 1978 by a group of parents that were discontent with the national school system.

The school's programme focuses on personalized education (as promoted and formalised by Professor Victor Garcia Hoz), being particularly renowned for its excellent academics and catholic teachings. The school offers education for  all years from kingergarden to high school, offering the International Baccalaureate programme.

Although the school accepts students from faiths and religions, the educational programme practiced in the school is of deep Catholic underpinnings with a particular preoccupation of involving the parents in the school's activities and programs. The school is very associated with the Opus Dei, not only drawing from it its values and principles, but also through the presence of ecclesiastics including their involvement in classes. The nomination of chaplains and Religion teachers is, therefore, a responsibility of the Opus Dei prelature. The school's chapel was consecrated by José Policarpo.

About
The school is widely known for its excellent standard and very good position in the national ranking of schools. The school received national mediatic attention several times because of its choice to be an all-boys school, something rare in Portugal. However, the schools presents this choice as a conscious one made in order for students to focus on academics.

Although it is usually regarded as a school for upper-class students this is not the reality as the school hosts students from various socio-economical backgrounds. 
	
Afonso, Prince of Beira is an alumnus of the school.

References

External links
Colégio Planalto Official Site
IBO Official Site

Catholic schools in Portugal
Schools in Portugal
Catholic secondary schools in Portugal
Opus Dei schools
International Baccalaureate schools in Portugal
Boys' schools in Portugal
Private schools in Portugal